The Dimitrov Constitution was the second Constitution of Bulgaria, in effect from 1947 to 1971. It formed the legal basis for Communist rule in Bulgaria.

Georgi Dimitrov, after whom the document is named, guided the framing of the 1947 constitution on the model of the 1936 Soviet Constitution. The Dimitrov Constitution guaranteed citizens equality before the law; freedom from discrimination; a universal welfare system; freedom of speech, the press, and assembly; and inviolability of person, domicile, and correspondence. But those rights were qualified by a clause prohibiting activity that would jeopardize the attainments of "the national revolution of 9 September 1944." Citizens were guaranteed employment but required to work in a socially useful capacity. The constitution also prescribed a planned national economy. Private property was allowed, if its possession was not "to the detriment of the public good."

References

External links 
 The text of the Constitution of 1947 in Bulgarian at the site of the Bulgarian Parliament.

Constitutions of Bulgaria
Defunct constitutions
Legal history of Bulgaria
1947 in Bulgaria
1947 documents
Constitution
1947 in law
1947 in politics